Elisiário is a municipality in the state of São Paulo in Brazil. The population is 3,697 (2020 est.) in an area of 94.0 km². The elevation is 494 m.

References

Municipalities in São Paulo (state)